"Shut Your Eyes" is a song by the Northern Irish band Snow Patrol. Initially a track on their 2006 album Eyes Open, it was released as a single in several countries in 2007.

The various B-sides featured on the single are taken from a Snow Patrol live performance at Columbiahalle, Berlin on 9 February 2007. The live renditions of "Spitting Games", "Run" and "Chocolate" included on the single later appeared on the Australian version of the "Signal Fire" single.

The band's drummer, Jonny Quinn, has declared that "Shut Your Eyes" is his favorite song to play live because of the interaction with the audience when the band perform it.

Music video
The official music video was directed by Mark Thomas and it premiered on Yahoo! Music on 10 July 2007.

Track listing
German CD
Version I:
"Shut Your Eyes" – 3:17
"Headlights on Dark Roads" (Live in Berlin) – 3:35
"Chocolate" (Live in Berlin) – 3:01
"You're All I Have" (Live in Berlin) – 4:38

Version II:
"Shut Your Eyes" – 3:17
"Set the Fire to the Third Bar" (Live in Berlin) – 3:27
"Spitting Games" (Live in Berlin) – 4:19
"Chasing Cars" (Live in Berlin) – 4:29

Version III:
"Shut Your Eyes" – 3:17
"Open Your Eyes" (Live in Berlin) – 5:44
"Run" (Live in Berlin) – 5:36
"Shut Your Eyes" (Live in Berlin) – 3:29

Dutch CD
Version I:
"Shut Your Eyes" – 3:17
"Chasing Cars" (Live in Berlin) – 4:29
This was the only Dutch release, released on 5 October 2007.

Unofficial Releases
Spencer Collective Mixes Bootleg (12" Vinyl):
"Shut Your Eyes" (Main Mix) – 7:28
"Shut Your Eyes" (Dub Mix) – 6:56

Naum Gabo Remix (12" Vinyl):
"Shut Your Eyes" (Naum Gabo Remix) – 7:00

Charts

Weekly charts

Year-end charts

References

External links
 

2007 singles
Snow Patrol songs
Song recordings produced by Jacknife Lee
2006 songs
Songs written by Gary Lightbody
Fiction Records singles
Interscope Records singles
Songs written by Nathan Connolly
Songs written by Jonny Quinn
Songs written by Tom Simpson (musician)
Songs written by Paul Wilson (musician)